Silveria Elfrieda Jacobs (born 31 July 1968) is a Sint Maarten politician and the Prime Minister of Sint Maarten .

Early life and education
Silveria Elfrieda Jacobs was born on 31 July 1968 on Aruba to Nadia Willemsberg. As a child, Jacobs attended the Leonald Conner School and Milton Peters College on Sint Maarten. After receiving her HAVO diploma in 1986, Jacobs enrolled at the University of the Virgin Islands where she obtained a bachelor's degree in Education. Between 1992 and 2011, Jacobs worked at the Leonald Conner primary school in Philipsburg, first as a teacher and later as a student coordinator.

Career
In 2010, Jacobs joined the National Alliance (NA). Between 2012 and 2013, she served as Minister of Education, Youth, Sport and Culture in the second Wescot-Williams cabinet. She also held this office from 2015 to 2018 in the first and second Marlin cabinets.

In 2014, she was elected a member of parliament. On 3 January 2018, she succeeded William Marlin as the NA party leader, the first woman in this position. In the previous three elections Jacobs, finished overall as the second largest vote getter behind Theodore Heyliger.

After the fall of the second Marlin-Romeo cabinet, a coalition agreement was reached between the National Alliance, the United St. Maarten Party and independent MPs Luc Mercelina and Chanel Brownbill. Jacobs was appointed by Governor Eugene Holiday on 30 September 2019 to form an interim cabinet that should, among other things, give priority to the completion of anti-money laundering legislation and the preparation of state elections and electoral reforms. The first Jacobs cabinet was sworn in on 19 November 2019.

Jacobs has been addressing the 2020 coronavirus pandemic in Sint Maarten. She ordered an extension to travel restrictions on 11 March 2020. The second Jacobs cabinet was sworn in on 28 March 2020.

See also
 List of Sint Maarten leaders of government

References

1968 births
Living people
Women prime ministers
Sint Maarten women in politics
Prime Ministers of Sint Maarten
National Alliance (Sint Maarten) politicians
21st-century Dutch women politicians
21st-century Dutch politicians
University of the Virgin Islands alumni